Dharan F.C. is a football club based in Dharan, Nepal. The club which plays its home game in Dharan Stadium also annually organizes Budha Subba Gold Cup. Due to A division centered around 14 clubs in Kathmandu, many talented footballing youths are forced to leave for Kathmandu for footballing career. This has impacted all parts of Nepal including Dharan. Hence, it is one of the reasons that there are no decent stadiums except in Kathmandu.

However, Dharan still produces many footballers every year and remains one of the biggest footballing town of east Nepal.

References

Football clubs in Nepal